Supreme TV (Sinhala: සුප්‍රීම් ටීවී) is a television channel currently broadcasting in Sri Lanka in the Sinhala language  It is owned by Supreme Global Holdings and it consists of the DVB-T2 pictures and stereo sounds. It currently holds all island coverage. It's programme content includes: Teledramas, International TV Series, Music, Movies, Documentaries, Entertainment, Political, Children's Programmes and News. The channel airs content mainly focusing on entertainment and sports. It was launched by Supreme Global Holdings. R. M. Manivannan is the chairman of the channel.

Background 
The channel was originally restricted to the Western Province and the operations of the channel were later expanded islandwide especially during the COVID-19 pandemic. In June 2021, the channel launched Supreme Educare project focusing on the students who study at the Ordinary Level.

The channel bagged the broadcasting rights as local channel partner in Sri Lanka for the two match T20I series between Oman and Sri Lanka which was held in Al Amerat Cricket Stadium, Muscat. It also airs 2021 South Asian Football Championships.

It also acquired the exclusive local broadcasting rights to telecast the second edition of the Lanka Premier League which is scheduled to begin in December 2021. Sri Lanka Cricket and Innovative Production Group apparently sealed a five year multi-million dollar agreement worth US$10 million with Supreme TV which is also regarded as one of the biggest broadcasting deals in Sri Lanka’s history. 

The channel telecast Sri Lanka Tour of India sri lanka territories. New Zealand v Sri Lanka Test match 2023

Analogue transmitters

See also
Digital Television
1080p
Full HD

References

External links
Official Website
frequency 

Sinhala-language television stations
Television channels and stations established in 2019
2019 establishments in Sri Lanka
Television channels and stations established in 2021
Mass media in Colombo